The Writing Camp is an American songwriting collective, founded by Evan "Kidd" Bogart and David "DQ" Quiñones. Since its formation in 2007, the team has been responsible for a series of successful released in pop, R&B and dance music, including 2008's "Right Here (Departed)" by Brandy and Beyoncé's "Halo."

History 
Eventually a trio, the collective was formed in October 2007 following a writing camp throw by Bogart & Quiñones in J.R. Rotem's studio at Chalice, adding Erika Nuri to the collective shortly thereafter. A fourth member originally added, Victoria Horn, a British songwriter, left the formation soon-after joining amicably due to creative and business differences about the overall goals of The Camp. The remaining original trio has since formed The Writing Camp LLC, housing a music publishing company, music production house and music supervision company for television, film & commercials. TWC Music Publishing has signed three songwriters Greg Ogan, Shari Short & Eric Bellinger, through their joint-venture with Sony ATV Music Publishing.

The 2011 Bravo series Platinum Hit was an elimination competition series featuring undiscovered singer-songwriters where talented newcomers battle through a series of innovative songwriting challenges to find out who's ready for the top of the pop charts. In each episode, the winning song will be revealed in a performance by a special guest star, some of the hottest singers today. True Entertainment (“The Real Housewives of Atlanta”) developed the reality series for Bravo with Steven Weinstock, Glenda Hersh, Tim Bogart, Evan Bogart, David Quinones and Erika Nuri serving as executive producers. The Writing Camp is also a producer.

Members
 Evan "Kidd" Bogart, the son of legendary Casablanca Records founder Neil Bogart, began rapping before transitioning into corporate gigs at Interscope and Warner Bros. Records, BAT Management, Casbah Artists Management, and Agency for the Performing Arts, where he aided in the discovery and development of Eminem, Maroon 5 and OneRepublic, among others. When his co-written "SOS", recorded by Rihanna, became a worldwide smash, Bogart returned to the creative side where he has since penned songs for everyone from Beyoncé to Leona Lewis.
 New York-born Erika Nuri spent formative creative time in the musical R&B hotbed of Atlanta before relocating to Los Angeles, signing a co-publishing deal with Kenneth "Babyface" Edmonds' company and garnering cuts with K-Ci & JoJo, Chingy (featuring Janet Jackson), B2K, Yasmeen and penning "Fatal" for J. Holiday. After a brief hiatus from the business, Nuri rebounded with an eight-week number 1 Billboard hit, the two-time Grammy nominated "When I See U" performed by American Idol champ Fantasia.
 David "DQ" Quinones was raised in the Washington, DC suburb of Sterling, VA. He attended Shenandoah Conservatory for music education and opera studies before entering Berklee College of Music with a focus on music production and engineering. His studio résumé in vocal production and arrangements is extensive and DQ has consistently "wowed" the likes of Rodney "Darkchild" Jerkins, J.R. Rotem, Ryan Tedder  and Midi Mafia, to name a few. DQ's has written most notably for Beyoncé, Brandy, Pussycat Dolls and Enrique Iglesias
 Boston native Greg Ogan signed with TWC Music Publishing/Sony ATV Music LLC in November 2009. He graduated Berklee College of Music with a focus on music production and engineering where he attended with TWC co-founder David "DQ" Quinones. Ogan spent over 2 years as the head engineer for J.R. Rotem's Beluga Heights where he worked closely with TWC co-founder Evan "Kidd" Bogart". While at Beluga Heights, Ogan worked on albums by Britney Spears, Leona Lewis, Rihanna, Natasha Bedingfield and Sean Kingston, among others. Ogan vocal-produced the majority of Kingston's sophomore release "Tomorrow".
 Los Angeles born and bred singer-songwriter Eric Bellinger signed with TWC Music Publishing/Sony ATV Music LLC in mid-2010. Grandson of Jackson 5 hit making songwriter Bobby Day (Rockin’ Robin, Little Bitty Pretty One), Bellinger has been singing since he could speak.  Eric Bellinger is an all-star talent who, in his young career, has already written for the likes of Chris Brown, Chipmunk, Greyson Chance, John Brown, Cali Swag District and Selena Gomez & The Scene.
 Singer/Songwriter Shari Short (former Miss Teen Idaho) moved from Idaho to Los Angeles several years ago to pursue her dream as an artist and songwriter. She signed with TWC Music Publishing/Sony ATV Music LLC in early-2010.  Shari has had songs placed on Desperate Housewives, Grey's Anatomy, and got her first cut as a songwriter on the Hannah Montana soundtrack. She has written with artists such as Joe Jonas, Matthew Morrison and co-wrote the theme song with Jessica Simpson & TWC's Bogart for Simpson's television show "Price of Beauty" on VH1.
New Jersey native Sonyae Elise grew up in a musical family being with her mother in the recording studio often. In 2011, Elise took part in the television series Platinum Hit and ultimately won the competition. As a part of her prize she won a publishing deal with The Writing Camp.

Discography

Singles

As songwriter
 2004: "Don't Worry"   Chingy featuring Janet Jackson 
 2006: "SOS" (Rihanna) - #1 on Billboard Hot 100 for 4 weeks
 2007: "When I See U"  (Fantasia) - #1 on Billboard Hot R&B/Hip Hops Songs for several weeks 
 2007: "Fuego"  (The Cheetah Girls) 
 2007/2008: "He Said She Said" (Ashley Tisdale) - #1 on MTV for 16 weeks
 2007/2008: "Take You There" (Sean Kingston) - Top 10 on Billboard Hot 100 for 7 weeks
 2008: "Homegirlz"  (Lala) 
 2008: "Give You the World" (The D.E.Y.)
 2008: "There's Nothin' (Remix)"  (Sean Kingston featuring Elan & Juelz Santana) 
 2008: "Karma" (NLT) 
 2008: "Future Love"  (Varsity Fanclub) 
 2008: "Too Good for Me"  (Rigo Luna) 
 2008: "Right Here (Departed)"  (Brandy) - #1 on Billboard Dance Chart 
 2008: "Reach Out"  (Hilary Duff) - #1 on Billboard Dance Chart 
 2009: "Halo"  (Beyoncé) - Top 10 on Billboard Hot 100 for 8 weeks, #1 on UK Radio for 5 weeks 
 2009: "Jai Ho! (You Are My Destiny)"  (The Pussycat Dolls) from Slumdog Millionaire 
 2009: "Sabotage"  (Kristinia Debarge) 
 2009: "Happy"  (Leona Lewis) 
 2009: "Future Love"  (Kristinia Debarge) 
 2010: "Automatik"  (Livvi Franc) 
 2010: "The Sky's the Limit"  (Jason DeRulo) 
 2010: "Waiting Outside the Lines"  (Greyson Chance) 
 2010/2011: "Friday to Sunday"  (Justice Crew) 
 2010/2011: "Champion"  (Chipmunk featuring Chris Brown) 
 2010/2011: "Tonight Tonight"  (Hot Chelle Rae)

Other credited songs
3LW - Love Don't Cost a Thing - Soundtrack
 14. "Hate 2 Love U"
Adam Lambert - For Your Entertainment
 13. "Broken Open"
 15. "Down the Rabbit Hole"  (iTunes bonus track) 
Ashley Tisdale - Headstrong
 03. "He Said She Said"
B2K - "Pandemonium!"
 10. "Would You Be Here"
Babyface - Face2Face
 12. "Don't Take It So Personal"
Namie Amuro - FEEL
 01. "Alive"
Beyoncé - I Am... Sasha Fierce
 02. "Halo" -  2010 Grammy Nominated for "Record of the Year" & "Best Female Pop Vocal Performance" 
 06. "Hello"
Big Time Rush - BTR
 10. "I Know U Know" -  Featuring Cymphonique 
Blake Lewis - A.D.D. (Audio Day Dream)
 06. "Surrender"
Brandy - Human
 00. "Right Here (Departed)
Britney Spears - Blackout
 15. "Everybody" - Bonus Track
Calvin Richardson - Bringing Down the House - Soundtrack
 08. "Next to You"
The Cheetah Girls - TCG
 01. "Fuego"
 07. "Do No Wrong"
Chingy - Powerballin'
 09. "Don't Worry" featuring Janet Jackson
Chipmunk - Transition
 00. "Champion"  featuring Chris Brown 
The D.E.Y. - The DEY Has Come EP
 02. "Give You the World"
 08. "Dame Un Memento"
Demi Lovato - Here We Go Again
 08. "Got Dynamite"
Donna Summer - Crayons
 02. "Mr. Music"
 04. "The Queen Is Back"
Enrique Iglesias - Euphoria
 04. "Dirty Dancer"  featuring Usher 
 05. "Why Not Me?"
Fantasia - Fantasia
 02. "When I See U"
Governor - Son of Pain
 04. "Be Yourself"
Greyson Chance - Hold On 'til the Night
 00. "Waiting Outside the Lines"
Heidi Montag - TBD
 00. "Body Language"
Hilary Duff - Best of Hilary Duff
 01. "Reach Out"
J. Holiday - Back of My Lac'
 10. "Fatal"
Jada (band) - "TBD"
 00."I'm That Chick" (also featured on the soundtrack to Bring It On: In It to Win It)
Jason Derülo - Jason Derülo
 04. "The Sky's the Limit"
 07. "Fallen"
 08. "Encore"
Jennifer Lopez - Brave
 01. "Stay Together"
Jennifer Lopez - Love?
 14. "Until It Beats No More"
Jesse McCartney - Departure
 07. "My Baby"
Jessi Malay - TBD
 00. "Gimme" featuring Lil Scrappy
 00. "Draw the Line"
Jessica Simpson - VH1's The Price of Beauty
 00. "Who We Are" (theme song)
Justice Crew - TBD
 00. "Friday to Sunday"
K-Ci & JoJo - "X"
 08. "All the Things I Should Have Known"
Keke Palmer - "So Uncool"
 07. "Footworkin'" also listed as "Footwurkin'"
Keyshia Cole - "A Different Me"
 12. "This Is Us"
Kristinia Debarge - "Exposed"
 02. "Future Love"
 03. "Speak Up"
 05. "Sabotage"
LaLa - "American Mija"
 00. "Homegirlz"
Leona Lewis - "Echo"
 01. "Happy"
 14. "Stone Hearts & Hand Grenades"  (Hidden Track & Amazon Exclusive bonus track) 
Livvi Franc - "TBD"
 00. "Automatik"
Lucy Walsh - "Lost in the Lights"
 01. "Crash"
 07. "Tell Her"
 08. "Guilty"
M. Pokora - "MP3"
 05. "Treason"
Melissa Schuman - "Love Don't Cost A Thing - Soundtrack"
 10. "Always"
NLT - Not Like Them
 00. "Karma"
No Angels - "Welcome to the Dance"
 07. "Shut Your Mouth"
 08. "Up Against the Wall"
Paris Hilton - "Paris"
 04. "I Want You"
Pussycat Dolls - TBD
 00. "Top of the World" - MTV's "The City" Theme Song
 00. "Jai Ho! (You Are My Destiny)" - from Slumdog Millionaire
Rigo Luna - "TBD"
 00. "Too Good for Me"
Rihanna - "A Girl Like Me"
 01. "SOS"
Sarah Connor - "Sexy as Hell"
 10. "Fall Apart"
Sean Kingston - "Sean Kingston"
 02. "Take You There"
 06. "Dry Your Eyes"
 08. "There's Nothin" featuring Paula DeAnda
 11. "Your Sister"
 00. "There's Nothin' (Remix)" featuring Elan from The D.E.Y. and Juelz Santana
Tony Rich - "Words"
 05. "Ghost"
Varsity Fanclub - "TBD"
 00. "Future Love"
 00. "Lost Then Found"
Xscape - "Off the Hook"
 12. "Keep It on the Real"

Awards
 01. BMI Billboard #1's Award for "SOS" performed by Rihanna  
 02. BMI Pop Award Top Songs of 2006 for "SOS" performed by Rihanna
 03. Two Grammy Nominations for "When I See U" by Fantasia for Best Female R&B Vocal Performance and Best R&B Song at the 50th Grammy Awards in 2008
 04. ASCAP 2007 Rhythm & Soul Music Award and Honoree for “When I See U” by Fantasia
 05. BMI Pop Award Top Songs of 2008 for "Take You There" performed by Sean Kingston
 06. Best Song "Halo" at the 2009 MTV Europe Music Awards
 07. BMI Pop Award Top Songs of 2009 for "Halo" performed by Beyoncé
 08. Grammy Award winning song "Halo" for Best Female Pop Vocal Performance 2010
 09. Grammy Nominated song "Halo" for Record of the Year 2010
 10. Grammy Nominated song "Halo (Live)" for Best Female Pop Vocal Performance 2011

References

External links
The Writing Camp on Myspace
Interview with Evan Bogart, HitQuarters Feb 2010

American songwriting teams
Record production teams
Musical collectives